Dam is a Danish and Faroese surname. Notable people with the surname include:

 Atli Dam (1932–2005), Prime Minister of the Faroe Islands
 Henrik Dam (1895–1976), Danish winning biochemist, recipient of the Nobel prize
 Jan Dam (footballer) (born 1968), Faroese footballer
 Jan Dam (boxer) (1905–1985), Belgian boxer
 Kenneth W. Dam (born 1932), American lawyer and politician
 Peter Mohr Dam (1898–1968), Prime Minister of the Faroe Islands
 Rigmor Dam (born 1971), Faroese politician
 Thomas Dam (1909–1986), inventor of the troll doll

See also
Dams (surname), northern-European surname
van Dam, Dutch surname
van Damm, Dutch surname
van Damme (disambiguation), Dutch surname

Danish-language surnames
Surnames of Danish origin